The 2005 French motorcycle Grand Prix was the fourth round of the 2005 MotoGP Championship. It took place on the weekend of 13–15 May 2005 at the Bugatti Circuit located in Le Mans, France.

MotoGP classification
Makoto Tamada was replaced by Jurgen van den Goorbergh after the first practice session due to a wrist injury he had sustained at the Portuguese Grand Prix.

250 cc classification

125 cc classification

Championship standings after the race (motoGP)

Below are the standings for the top five riders and constructors after round four has concluded.

Riders' Championship standings

Constructors' Championship standings

 Note: Only the top five positions are included for both sets of standings.

References

French motorcycle Grand Prix
French
Motorcycle Grand Prix
French motorcycle Grand Prix